Elections to Liverpool City Council were held on 1 November 1920.

One third of the council seats were up for election. The term of office for each councillor being three years.

Nine of the 38 seats were uncontested.

After the election, the composition of the council was:

Election result

Ward results

* - Retiring Councillor seeking re-election

Comparisons are made with the 19?? election results, as the retiring councillors were elected in 19??.

Abercromby

Aigburth

Allerton

Anfield

Breckfield

{{Election box candidate with party link|
  |party      = Conservative Party (UK)
  |candidate  = Alfred Griffiths *
  |votes      = 3,859
  |percentage = 73%''
  |change     = 
}}

Brunswick

Castle Street

Childwall

Dingle

Edge Hill

Everton

Exchange

Fairfield

Fazakerley

Garston

Granby

Great George

Kensington

Kirkdale

Low Hill

Much Woolton

Netherfield

North Scotland

Old Swan

Prince's Park

Sandhills

St. Anne's

St. Domingo

St. Peter's

Sefton Park East

Sefton Park West

South Scotland

Vauxhall

Walton

Warbreck

Wavertree

Wavertree West

West Derby

Aldermanic Elections

Aldermanic Election 9 November 1920

At the meeting of the council on 9 November 1920, the terms of office of eighteen alderman expired.

The following eighteen were elected as Aldermen by the councillors on 9 November 1920 for a term of six years.*''' - re-elected aldermen.

Aldermanic Election 2 March 1921

Caused by the death of Alderman William Roberts (Conservative, last elected as an Alderman by the council on 9 November 1913 on 17 January 1921, which was reported to the council on 19 January 1921.

In his place, Councillor Charles Henry Rutherford JP (Conservative, Princes Park, last elected 1 November 1920) was elected as an alderman by the council on 2 March 1921.

Aldermanic Election 6 April 1921

Caused by the death of Alderman James Heald (Conservative last elected as an alderman by the council on 9 November 1920), in whose place Councillor Max Muspratt (Liberal, Vauxhall, last elected unopposed on 1 November 1914) was elected by the council as an alderman on 6 April 1921.

Aldermanic Election 27 July 1921

Caused by the death of Alderman James Willcox Alsop OBE (Conservative, elected as an alderman by the council on 9 November 1914) on 19 May 1921, in whose place Councillor John George Paris (Conservative, Kirkdale, last elected 1 November 1920), Fine Art Dealer of 40 Falkner Square, Liverpool, was elected by the council as an alderman on 27 July 1921.

By-elections

No. 14 Granby, 23 November 1920

Caused by the election as an alderman of Councillor Joseph Harrison Jones (Liberal, Granby, elected 1 November 1918)  by the council on 9 November 1920

No. 13 Princes Park, 13 December 1920 

Caused by the resignation of Councillor Acheson Lyle Rupert Rathbonr (Liberal, Princes Park, elected 1 November 1911( which was reported to the council on 1 December 1920.

No. 13 Princes Park, 14 March 1921

Caused by the election by the councillors of  Councillor Charles Henry Rutherford JP (Conservative, Princes Park, last elected 1 November 1920)
as an alderman on 2 March 1921, following the death of Alderman William Roberts (Conservative, last elected as an Alderman by the councillors on 9 November 1913) on 17 January 1921

No. 4 Vauxhall

Caused by the election by the council as an alderman of Councillor Max Muspratt (Liberal, Vauxhall, last elected unopposed on 1 November 1914) on 6 April 1921, following the death of Alderman James Heald (Conservative last elected as an alderman by the council on 9 November 1920).

No. 24 Kirkdale 8 August 1921

Caused by the election as an alderman by the Council of Councillor John George Paris (Conservative, Kirkdale, last elected 1 November 1920) on 27 July 1921, following the death of Alderman James Willcox Alsop OBE (Conservative, elected as an alderman by the council on 9 November 1914) on 19 May 1921

No. 7 Castle Street 28 September 1921

Caused by the death of Councillor Frank Ambrose Goodwin (Conservative, Castle Street, last elected as a councillor on 1 November 1919) on 14 July 1921

See also

 Liverpool City Council
 Liverpool Town Council elections 1835 - 1879
 Liverpool City Council elections 1880–present
 Mayors and Lord Mayors of Liverpool 1207 to present
 History of local government in England

References

1920
1920 English local elections
1920s in Liverpool